Comhaltan mac Maol Cúlaird, Irish dynast, fl. 10th century.

Comhaltan was a member of the Uí Fiachrach Aidhne dynasty of south County Galway, and was the ancestor of the Uí Comhaltan, (Colton/Coulton), a minor surname in the south Connacht-north Munster area.

He was the father of Giolla Ceallaigh mac Comhaltan, and a kinsman to Seachnasach mac Donnchadh, Scannlán mac Fearghal, Eidhean mac Cléireach, and Cathal mac Ógán, who gave their names to the families of O'Shaughnessy, Ó Scannláin, Ó Cléirigh, Ó hEidhin/Hynes and Ó Cathail/Cahill.

References
 The Surnames of Ireland, Edward MacLysaght, Dublin, 1978, p. 52.
 Irish Kings and High Kings, Francis John Byrne, 2001 (second edition).
 The Great Book of Irish Genealogies, 259.10, pp. 588-89, volume two, Dubhaltach MacFhirbhisigh; edited, with translation and indices by Nollaig Ó Muraíle, 2003-2004. .

People from County Galway
10th-century Irish people